Von der Goltz is the name of an old and influential German noble family whose members occupied many important positions in the Kingdom of Prussia and later in the German Empire.

History 
The family can trace their lineage from East Brandenburg back to 12th century. On 19 September 1786 the family was raised to the title of Count in Prussia by King Frederick William II.

Notable members 
Albert Graf von der Goltz (1893–1944), a German Oberst (colonel) killed in action during World War II
Augustus Frederick, Graf von der Goltz (1765–1818), First Prussian Minister for Foreign Affairs
Colmar Freiherr von der Goltz (1843–1916), Prussian Field Marshal and military writer
Gottfried von der Goltz (born 1964), German-Norwegian violinist and conductor
Gustav von Golz (1833–1908), Prussian general of the infantry
Horst von der Goltz (1884–?), German spy and actor
Kuno von der Goltz (1817–1897), Prussian general of the infantry and politician
Max von der Goltz (1838–1906), German admiral
Rüdiger von der Goltz (1865–1946) a German Major-General during World War I, Finnish Civil War, Estonian War of Independence, and Latvian War of Independence

See also
Goltz

References

Military families of Germany
German-language surnames